Lăpușna is a commune in Hîncești District, Moldova. It is composed of three villages: Anini, Lăpușna and Rusca.

Notable natives 
 Vlad Filat 
 Elena Postică

References

Communes of Hîncești District
Kishinyovsky Uyezd